Juan Carlos Rodríguez Patiño (born August 14, 1990) is a Venezuelan professional boxer. As an amateur, he won a bronze medal at the 2011 Pan American Games. He was considered a top amateur boxer at middleweight in Venezuela.

Amateur career
In 2011 Rodríguez won a silver medal in first Pan American Games Qualifier at middleweight. He was defeated by the score of 10-4 before the silver medal at the Beijing 2008 Olympic Games by the Cuban Emilio Correa. At the 2011 Pan American Games held in Mexico, Rodríguez won the middleweight bronze medal.

References

External links
 

1990 births
Living people
Middleweight boxers
Venezuelan male boxers
People from Cumaná
Pan American Games medalists in boxing
Pan American Games bronze medalists for Venezuela
Boxers at the 2011 Pan American Games
Medalists at the 2011 Pan American Games